Valeriy Yuriyovych Bondar (born 27 February 1999) is a Ukrainian professional football defender who plays for Shakhtar Donetsk and the Ukraine national team.

Club career
Bondar started playing football in Shakhtar Donetsk in 2007. In the 2018–2019 season, he played for Shakhtar in the category U21.

He made his debut for Shakhtar Donetsk in the Ukrainian Premier League in a match against Lviv on 4 May 2019.

International career
On 15 June 2019, Bondar won the FIFA U-20 World Cup with the Ukraine U20 national team, whom he captained.

He made his debut for senior national team on 11 November 2020 in a friendly game against Poland. He substituted Yukhym Konoplya in the 63rd minute.

Honours
Shakhtar Donetsk
Ukrainian Premier League: 2018–19, 2019–20
Ukrainian Cup: 2018–19
Ukrainian Super Cup: 2021

Ukraine U20
FIFA U-20 World Cup: 2019

Career statistics

Club

International

References

External links
 
 

Living people
1999 births
Footballers from Kharkiv
Ukrainian footballers
Association football defenders
Ukraine youth international footballers
Ukraine under-21 international footballers
Ukraine international footballers
FC Shakhtar Donetsk players
Ukrainian Premier League players